Taipingqiao station is a metro station on Line 1 and Line 3 of the Harbin Metro. The station for Line 1 opened on September 26, 2013, and the station for Line 3 opened on November 26, 2021.

References

Railway stations in China opened in 2013